Bell Satellite TV (formerly known as Bell ExpressVu, Dish Network Canada and ExpressVu Dish Network and not to be confused with Bell's IPTV Fibe TV service) is the division of BCE Inc. that provides satellite television service across Canada. It launched on September 10, 1997. As of April 2017, Bell Satellite TV provides over 700 channels (including over 430 SDTV, 200 HDTV and 80 audio channels) to over 1 million subscribers. Its major competitors include satellite service Shaw Direct, as well as various cable and communications companies across Canada.

Bell Satellite TV for Condos launched as Bell ExpressVu for Condos in 2004. It was a VDSL service for select multidwelling units (condominiums and apartments) in Montreal, Ottawa and Toronto. It later evolved into an IPTV service. Since 2010, this service operates as Bell Fibe TV and is delivered over FTTN or FTTH technology. By the end of the decade, Fibe TV became Bell's main television service offering, with over 75% more subscribers compared to satellite TV.

Bell Satellite TV services were also repackaged and resold by Telus as Telus Satellite TV, in areas where the latter company's Optik IPTV services are unavailable.

History

1990s: inception as ExpressVu
ExpressVu was conceived in 1994, at the time of American DSS systems launch, as a consortium of Ontario-based Tee-Comm Electronics, Canadian Satellite Communications (Cancom), Vancouver-based Western International Communications (WIC) and Bell Canada Enterprises (BCE), with a projected startup date of late 1995. High technology development costs and delays placed Tee-Comm in a severe financial position, prompting the remaining partners to pull out in 1996. Instead, U.S. satellite-TV provider Echostar Dish Network was chosen to provide the receivers and uplink equipment. The Hughes DirecTV system had already been optioned to Power Broadcasting, in Canada; it has since been withdrawn. Tee-Comm on its own managed to launch the first DBS service in Canada, AlphaStar, in early 1997; however, in a matter of months the company went bankrupt and the service was discontinued, leaving thousands of consumers with useless receivers (although with some reconfiguration, could be used to receive unencrypted FTA channels). ExpressVu launched service in September 1997, initially as "Dish Network Canada", followed by "ExpressVu Dish Network", in both cases using the Echostar logo.

2000s: Bell purchases ExpressVu, later renames it Bell Satellite TV

Bell took over full ownership of ExpressVu by 2000.

The ExpressVu name was retired in August 2008 along with the Today Just Got Better advertising campaign. Bell's television services as a whole are now simply called Bell TV.  When disambiguation is required, the satellite service is called Bell Satellite TV.

Plans have been shelved for any additional ExpressVu satellite expenditures assuming pending CRTC and Industry Canada approval for Dish Network to use all 32 transponders on Nimiq 5. As a result of this, SES has announced that they will not be replacing the ill-fated AMC-14 now that Dish Network has cut this deal with Telesat & BCE for Nimiq 5 usage.

In 2009, Telus reached a deal to resell a re-packaged version of the Bell Satellite TV service in parts of Alberta and British Columbia known as Telus Satellite TV. The agreement was designed to allow Telus the ability to "instantly" offer a quadruple play of services in markets where it has not yet deployed its IPTV services, while also allowing Bell to increase its television market share in Western Canada. The Telus-branded service co-exists with the Bell-branded version of Bell Satellite TV, which is still offered in the markets that Telus Satellite TV is offered. As of March 31, 2018 Telus Satellite TV is no longer available to new customers. Current subscribers can update their channels by calling 310-MYTV (6968). https://www.telus.com/en/tv/satellite

2010s: discontinuation of SDTV receivers and traditional theme packages
In 2012, Bell changed satellite plans in Ontario. They are now sold in packages called "Good", "Better" and "Best" similarly to its competitor Rogers Cable in that region. Channels in the "Best" tier can still be purchased in theme packages, and existing customers with older plans are grandfathered. This also does not affect other regions such as Quebec, where there are different types of plans. Along with these changes, Bell discontinued sales and rentals of its final standard-definition television (SDTV) receiver, the 4100 model. Customers who still have an older SDTV with an AV input (or peripheral modulator) can use an HD receiver, but the quality will be limited to 480i due to technical limitations.

Satellites 

Bell Satellite TV broadcasts from two geostationary satellites: Nimiq 4 and 6. Nimiq 4 was launched on September 19, 2008, and Nimiq 6 was launched on May 17, 2012. Both satellites follow an equatorial path, giving coverage to most of Canada. Nimiq is an Inuktitut word for "that which unifies" and was chosen from a nationwide naming contest in 1998. The two satellites are owned and operated by Telesat Canada. Bell's uplink site is located in North York, Toronto, Ontario.

Nimiq 4, located at 82° W primarily serves Bell's high-definition television content. Nimiq 6, located at 91.1°W primarily serves Bell's standard-definition television and radio content. Each satellite has 32 Ku-band transponders. A transponder usually has enough bandwidth to broadcast approximately 10 channels. Because HDTV requires more bandwidth, some transponders typically broadcast only 4-5 channels. LyngSat provides a listing of channels on Nimiq 4 and Nimiq 6 broken down by transponder.

Past satellites
Nimiq 1 was launched on May 20, 1999 and contains 32 Ku-band transponders. at 91°W. (From the time of service launch in 1997 to the switch to Nimiq in 1999, ExpressVu used the already crowded Anik E2.) Nimiq 2, launched on December 29, 2002, also includes 32 K-band transponders. Nimiq 2 provides HDTV, international programming, and all newly released channels. It occupies the 82° W slot. Nimiq 3 went online on August 23, 2004. Originally called DirecTV3, it is an old DirecTV satellite moved to a new orbital slot near Nimiq 1 to offload some of the transmitting work from the original satellite. In February 2006, Nimiq 3 was moved behind Nimiq 2 to support it, while another satellite, Nimiq 4i (formerly DirecTV2), took Nimiq 3s spot behind Nimiq 1. Nimiq 4i was replaced with Nimiq 4iR as it ran out of fuel on April 28, 2007 and was de-orbited. Both Nimiq 3 and Nimiq 4iR feature 16 Ku-band transponders. Nimiq 4 was launched by a Proton rocket which lifted off on September 19, 2008 at 21:48 UTC.

Hardware

Receivers
Bell Satellite TV satellite receivers are manufactured for Dish Technology by Jabil in India and DD&TT in China. Two different high-definition television (HDTV) receivers are currently provided, with either optional or built-in personal video recorder (PVR) capabilities:
 Whole Home PVR (9500) is Bell Satellite TV's latest PVR, released in 2018. It is slim like the 6400 and succeeds the larger 9241. The internal 1 TB hard drive allows for up to 500 hours of SDTV, or 150 hours of HDTV. It offers both an HDMI and composite video output, but removed component video and RF modulator output that were included in many previous receivers. This receiver has a dual tuner, allowing viewers to watch one channel while recording it and/or another.
 Whole Home Receiver (7500) is a single-tuner HDTV receiver, released in 2018. Like the 9500, it is limited to HDMI and composite video. It does not include an internal hard disk drive, but can receive PVR capabilities by being connected to a 9500 on the same dish, or when an external hard disk drive is connected to the USB 2.0 port on the 7500. The drive stores a one-hour data buffer, allowing one to rewind and pause a live TV program for that time period.

Bell has discontinued older receivers which either only supported standard-definition television (SDTV) or included a series of features that newer receivers no longer offer. Some discontinued receivers include:
 Standard-Definition Receiver (4100) was Bell's last standard-definition television (SDTV) receiver, sold until March 2012. It is compact and provides coaxial cable, composite video, S-Video and TOSLINK outputs. It had no built-in PVR capabilities, requiring an external device such as a VCR or DVD recorder to record shows.
 Standard-Definition PVR (5900) was Bell's last SDTV PVR. It could record up to 80 hours of programming. However, it was a single-tuner receiver, limited to one channel at a time.
 HD PVR Plus Receiver (9242) was a dual-tuner PVR. It included channel distribution (allowing multiple TVs to use this receiver in standard definition), picture-in-picture (watching two channels simultaneously on one TV), and an over-the-air TV tuner (to watch and record non-satellite programming). Bell commonly sold the 9241, a dual-tuner PVR without these additional features.

While current HD receivers support the 480i, 480p, 720p, 1080i and 1080p resolutions, broadcast channels are limited to letterboxed 480i (effectively 360i in widescreen) for standard-definition channels, and 720p for high-definition channels. Web-based content is available in 1080p, including Netflix, Crave (a Bell service), and Bell video on demand.

Bell offers composite video outputs on almost all receivers, including the 9500 and 7500, to support older televisions. This connection is limited to 480i resolution. Receivers can use the optional gray bars mode, designed to prevent burn-in on plasma televisions.

Remotes
Many types of remotes have been released over the years. Models 1000 and 2700 came out with very basic infrared (IR) remotes that could be used only to control the receivers themselves and would operate on all 16 remote addresses. Replacement remotes then came with universal functions allowing users to control the power and volume of their televisions along with VCRs and sound system receivers; these remotes can only operate on a single address at a time. Models equipped with a UHF antenna can respond to UHF remotes; these remotes use radio frequencies rather than IR signals to control the receivers. UHF signals can reach up to 30 meters, depending on the restrictions of building materials. All UHF-compatible receivers can simultaneously respond to IR signals except for model 4500.  For this model, modification directions exist on the Internet to add IR receiving capability, in order for the receiver to respond to programmable universal remotes. Remote #2 of the 3200, 5200, 9200, and the remote for model 6100 are based on "UHF Pro". "UHF Pro" remotes are strictly compatible with the receivers they are provided with and do not function on regular UHF-compatible receivers. Additionally, "UHF Pro" remotes can only communicate with UHF frequencies and cannot control receivers via IR. To prevent interference with other UHF remotes in proximity, clients should change their remote addresses. All secondary remotes for dual tuners may also be converted to remote #1 by flipping the plastic bottom of the remote. This also switches its transmission mode from UHF Pro to regular UHF and IR, similar to how a 5900 remote operates.

Satellite dishes
Bell Satellite TV currently provides 50 cm (20") dishes to its customers. Canadians living in the territories and certain parts of British Columbia and northern mainland portion of Newfoundland and Labrador require larger dishes between 60 and 120 cm; these are used to compensate for the weaker satellite signal available to these regions. The 50 cm dish supports two LNBs. The size of the dish was increased from 18 to 20 inches in late 2001 to accommodate a second LNB to acquire signal from Nimiq 2 (BEV 82) satellite. At the end of the dish's arm, a Y-adapter is found which holds both LNBs. The BEV 91 LNB is in the centre of the dish while the BEV 82 LNB is offset to the left. Rotating the dish (i.e., modifying the skew angle) changes the position of the 82 LNB while maintaining position for BEV 91. A switchbox, typically an SW21 or SW44, is used to merge both satellite signals into receivers.

Smartcards
To authorize programming, a portable smartcard is used for older receivers. This includes the 1000, 2700, 2800, 3000, 3100, 3500, 3700, 4000, 4500, 4700, 5100, 5800, 5900 and the 6000. In some cases, Bell Satellite TV has switched back to using standard smartcards for the 6100 9200 and 9400 receivers.

In February 2008, Bell Satellite TV announced a second smartcard swap involving all its receivers with the exception of the 6141 and 9241 models. This was required due to the massive intrusion of ExpressVu signals that occurred with the Nagravision 2 encryption. The latter standard was implemented on May 27, 2005, to end the unlicensed access that occurred with the first Nagravision system.

Bell Satellite TV has upgraded to Nagravision 3 as the new encryption standard, to prevent unauthorized access to pay TV channels. The only means to view Bell Satellite TV illegally is through IKS (Internet Key Sharing) devices which include NFusion FTA and the Slinger. Both devices are not hacks but only means of a workaround. Bell Satellite TV is currently working towards shutting down these types of devices. No known hacks exist for the Nagravision 3 protocol.

Newer receivers incorporate smartchips instead, which are permanently installed inside the receiver. According to Bell Tech Support, a 4100 with smartchip will require a newer smartcard upgrade.

Unsupported hardware
In 2009, Bell 6000 receiver owners received letters in the mail that state they must swap to a 6141 or face losing programming as Bell Satellite TV deployed MPEG-4 with 8PSK. The 6000 does support the use of 8PSK with an add-in module, but Bell Satellite TV decided not to send out these as the 6000 is old and most customers will be wanting to upgrade to a 6141 which can have a hard disk drive added to it to be used as a PVR. The guide for programming information is also updated and stores more information in its database than the 6000.

Later, starting in October 2011, Bell announced that it would replace all currently active MPEG-2 HD satellite receivers, specifically the 6100 and 9200 models, with MPEG-4 HD receivers. This is to allow current HD channels to be encoded in MPEG-4 instead of MPEG-2, providing free space for 43 additional local standard definition channels which will begin airing in September 2012. 6100 owners will receive the latest 6131 HD receiver, while 9200 owners will receive either a 9241 or a 9242. If the 9200 receiver was used for two televisions, Bell will provide either a 9241 with a 5900 or a 9242. Both setups permit the two televisions to watch Bell Satellite TV but recording and playback with the 5900 does not equal the 9200 for the second TV. About 240 000 receivers in 193 000 homes will be replaced.

 Services 

 3D television 
3D television (3DTV) is available across Canada with Bell Satellite TV. The 2010 Masters Tournament on Bell Satellite TV was the first national 3D broadcast, making Bell Satellite TV the first Canadian satellite television service to broadcast in 3D. Content will be available free of charge to Bell HDTV subscribers, although a 3D HDTV and 3D glasses are required to view 3D programming.

Installation

Bell normally provides free installation to new customers for their first PVR in exchange of a two-year contract. There is still a one-time activation fee of no more than $50 to pay. On Bell Media television channels, Bell advertises this as "One phone call can get you set up as early as tomorrow."

One to four receivers are typically connected to a single satellite dish. Setting up a greater number of receivers is more complicated and costly, so Bell does not provide setup in such circumstances. Customers are free to set up more than four receivers at their own risk. This also applies to any self-installed equipment such as second-hand receivers. Bell's receiver limits can prove to be challenging for larger homes or multi-family residential units because landlords tend to prohibit the installation of more than one satellite dish.

Residential accounts are limited to a maximum of six receivers per account, but each of them can be a dual tuner receiver; therefore up to 12 televisions can be served however the current receiver lineup offered by Bell does not support 2 televisions as the 9242 receiver was discontinued. Account stacking, which consists of having receivers on one account located in different locations, is contrary to the Bell Satellite TV Residential and Commercial Agreements. It is certainly not illegal, and in a worst-case scenario, service will be cancelled. This practice is detailed in CRTC Public Notice 2006-133 and 2006-134. There is no requirement whatsoever in the Regulations that prohibits a BDU (broadcast distribution undertaking) from providing service at more than one location via a single account. Bell has mostly focused on improving its satellite signal reception in Canada while seeking to prevent snowbirds from accessing this signal. The use of Bell Satellite TV services in the United States is not illegal, but it remains a controversial issue.

Interactive services
Current and many past receiver models support interactive services, branded as iTV, offering information services for weather and sports. When watching The Weather Network, for example, one can select their local city to receive detailed information about that city's weather conditions. For sports such as NFL Sunday Ticket or NHL Centre Ice, iTV allows fans to simultaneously keep track of multiple games. This means that when the watcher is concentrating on one single game, they will be notified if the score changes for other games.

Basic video games, lottery results and horoscopes were previously available as Bell Satellite TV interactive services. Pornography-themed video games were also offered in the past via Bell's sex industry brand, Venus. These services have been discontinued as part of the Today Just Got Better rebranding. Wireless game controllers, sold for use with Game Galaxy and Venus Games, have been cleared out for the price of $4.99 each at Bell-owned The Source.

Pay-per-view
Pay-per-view (PPV) events may be ordered either via the receiver itself with a remote control and phone line connection, via Bell's website, or via an automated phone system. Regular movies tend to cost less, while adult and sports programming have a higher cost. Channel 299 previously featured classic movies at 99 cents each, but this channel has been pulled off the air in 2011. Bell Satellite TV carries movies recently released on DVD along with major sporting events including boxing, WWE and Ultimate Fighting Championship. Red Carpet Vu!''' is a Pay-per-view movie service broadcast in a group of up to ten different channels where a daily featured movie starts every fifteen minutes.

Some customers have the misconception that the optional phone line, when plugged into the receiver, is used for software downloads and programming changes. In fact, the only information the line receives, if available from and supported by the phone line, consists of caller ID informations displayed in a pop-up notification for the viewer's convenience when a phone call is being received. The phone line simply automates the process of ordering pay-per-view by dialing out the Event ID and other information that would be requested by manually calling the pay-per-view phone system.

Support and warranties
Bell Satellite TV provides technical support 24/7, however it will only support its products. Any type of picture troubleshooting must be done with a direct connection from the receiver to the television. For new customers, the first receiver is normally installed at no cost to the customer.

All labour for installations is only under warranty for three months. Receivers are under warranty for as long as they are rented. Purchased equipment comes with a default warranty of one year with the option of taking an extended warranty. Only manufacturer's defects will warrant replacement of a dish under coverage, as a strict policy is in place regarding "Acts of God" and dish damage, which includes violent weather disabling a dish or mis-aligning it, as well as any physical modifications by the customer such as painting the dish.

Alternative Bell TV offerings

Bell also offers IPTV and mobile television services where available.

Bell Fibe TV

The Bell Fibe TV service is an implementation of IPTV that uses VDSL to deliver television service via telephone lines. Early versions of this service was originally deployed as "Bell ExpressVu for Condos" to get around restrictions regarding the mounting of satellite dishes. The original service was trialled using "NextLevel Communications" (now part of Motorola) set-top boxes that receive television broadcasts over VDSL in ATM form. The network infrastructure can support large amounts of bandwidth (typically 25 Mbit/s, as of January 2012) and is available in certain cities, including Toronto, Ottawa, Montreal and Quebec City.

Bell Mobile TV

Since October 18, 2010, Bell Mobility allows smartphones and tablet computers on either its HSPA+ or LTE network to access Mobile TV. Virgin Mobile Canada customers can also access Mobile TV. Similar systems by Bell in the past used the phased-out CDMA network. Unlimited access via Wi-Fi was previously available, but has since been discontinued. The service is billed per hour, and customers do not pay any additional fees.

 Channels 
Bell Satellite TV currently features over 500 channels including all major Canadian networks and several American TV stations (ABC, CBS, Fox, NBC and PBS affiliates), premium movie services, Vu! pay-per-view service, popular radio stations, sports, international and adult programming. The company provides over 130 High Definition channels, which used to be the most in Canada, until Shaw Direct launched its new satellite Anik G1 on May 29, 2013.  Today Shaw Direct customers access to over 400 HD channels. Bell Satellite TV's programming changes constantly.

 Show and Extra magazines 
Bell Satellite TV produced a monthly magazine called Show (the French version is called Extra''). Show debuted in September 2007, and replaced Bell Satellite TV Magazine, the previous name for the customer publication from ExpressVu.

Show was delivered to over 800,000 Bell Satellite TV customers and showcases entertainment from Canada, Hollywood and around the world.

Show Magazine and Extra had been cancelled by Bell Satellite TV to save paper in early 2008.

References

External links 

 Bell Satellite TV Official site
 Bell interactive channel listing
 Official List of Bell Satellite TV Channels
 Bell Satellite TV Customer service info
Bell Satellite TV online for Bell subscribers
 Bell Satellite TV Remote PVR lets you schedule and manage TV recordings
 Nimiq 6 Launch video

Cable and DBS companies of Canada
Direct broadcast satellite services
Bell Canada
Companies based in Montreal
Mass media companies established in 1997
1997 establishments in Canada